Yusiel Nápoles Marcillan (born November 19, 1983) is a Cuban amateur boxer best known to win the 2006 Central American and Caribbean Games at light heavyweight. He is not to be confused with middleweight Yudiel Nápoles.

Career
2005 he participated at the world championships but was KOd by Mourad Sahraoui.

2006 he won Gold at the Central American and Caribbean Games beating Eleider Álvarez in the quarterfinals, Carlos Negron in the semi and Shawn Terry Cox in the final.

2007 he reached the final of the PanAm Games by beating Christopher Downs but was KOd by his old foe Alvarez.

He did not participate in the Nationals 2008 and wasn't sent to the Olympic qualifier.

External links
Central American games

1983 births
Living people
Light-heavyweight boxers
Boxers at the 2007 Pan American Games
Cuban male boxers
Pan American Games silver medalists for Cuba
Pan American Games medalists in boxing
Central American and Caribbean Games gold medalists for Cuba
Competitors at the 2006 Central American and Caribbean Games
Central American and Caribbean Games medalists in boxing
Medalists at the 2007 Pan American Games
21st-century Cuban people